The Makah language is the indigenous language spoken by the Makah. Makah has not been spoken as a first language since 2002, when its last fluent native speaker died. However, it survives as a second language, and the Makah tribe is attempting to revive the language, including through preschool classes. The endonym for the Makah is qʷi·qʷi·diččaq.

The Makah reside in the northwestern corner of the Olympic Peninsula of Washington on the south side of the Strait of Juan de Fuca. It is closely related to Nuu-chah-nulth and Ditidaht, which are languages of the First Nations of the west coast of Vancouver Island on the north side of the strait, in the Canadian province of British Columbia. Makah is the only member of the Wakashan language family in the United States, with the other members spoken in British Columbia, from Vancouver Island to the Central Coast region.

Makah, Nuu-chah-nulth and Ditidaht belong to the Southern Nootkan branch of the Wakashan family. The Northern Wakashan languages, which are Kwak'wala, Heiltsuk-Oowekyala and Haisla, are spoken farther north, beyond the territory of the Nuu-chah-nulth.

Phonology
The phonemes (distinctive sounds) of Makah are presented below in the Makah alphabet; if the symbol in the native alphabet differs from the IPA symbol, the IPA equivalent will be given in brackets.

Consonants

Rare among the world's languages, Makah has no nasal phonemes, a trait it shares with the neighboring Quileute language.

Vowels

Morphology
"Like other Wakashan languages, Makah inflects verbs for evidentiality, indicating the level and source of the speaker's knowledge about a statement. Some examples are shown in the following table:[8]

Alongside those examples, compare corresponding sentences without the evidentials: hi·dawʔal, "he found it"; č̓apac̓, "it's a canoe"; haʔuk̓alic, "you're eating"; dudu·k̓al, "he's singing"."

The Makah word encodes much information; Davidson (2002) outlines the formal word structure below (pg. 160),

The 'unextended word' consists of a root (the 'base'), lexical suffixes, and aspectual suffixes. It carries the 'dictionary meaning' of the word, while the clitics represent what can be thought of as 'inflections' for other grammatical categories. The unextended word,

Lexical suffixes: Come in two varieties; nuclear, which can change the base's meaning or part of speech, and restrictive, which add to the base's meaning without altering the word class. The latter include locational and directional suffixes.
Aspectual suffixes: While they vary in realization, the extended word can mark for the following aspects,
Perfective, Imperfective, Graduative, Durative, Continuative, Repetitive, & Iterative

The 'expanded unextended' word is formed by the addition of a peripheral suffix, which can change the part of speech while and often contains an aspectual value. These suffixes 'cross-cut' the core/nuclear distinction. The order of the clitic sequence is as follows:

The modal-pronominal clitics are often combined, creating a separate set of pronominal clitics for each mood. Makah marks for the indicative, purposive, quotative, subordinate, inferential, mirative, conditional, relative, content interrogative and polar interrogative moods.

References

Bibliography
Renker, Ann M. and Gunther, Erna (1990). "Makah". In "Northwest Coast", ed. Wayne Suttles. Vol. 7 of Handbook of North American Indians, ed. William C. Sturtevant. Washington, D.C.: Smithsonian Institution.

External links

 The Wakashan Linguistics Page
 Makah language (Qwiqwidicciat), at native-languages.org
 Makah whaling transcript, with audio
 Makah language, Olympic Peninsula Community Museum
 Makah language and culture classes at Neah Bay High School, 2006-2007
 OLAC resources in and about the Makah language

Makah
Wakashan languages
Indigenous languages of the Pacific Northwest Coast
Indigenous languages of Washington (state)
Endangered Wakashan languages